Clethrogyna is a genus of tussock moths in the family Erebidae. The genus was described by Rambur in 1866.

Species
Clethrogyna antiquoides (Hübner, 1822)
Clethrogyna aurolimbata (Guenée, 1835)
Clethrogyna corsica (Boisduval, 1834)
Clethrogyna dubia (Tauscher, 1806)
Clethrogyna josephina (Austaut, 1880)
Clethrogyna rupestris (Rambur, 1832)
Clethrogyna splendida (Rambur, 1842)
Clethrogyna trigotephras (Boisduval, 1829)
Clethrogyna turbata (Butler, 1879)

References

Lymantriinae
Moth genera